Scopula stephanitis is a moth of the  family Geometridae. It is found in the Democratic Republic of Congo, Rwanda and Uganda.

References

Moths described in 1932
Taxa named by Louis Beethoven Prout
stephanitis
Insects of the Democratic Republic of the Congo
Moths of Africa